Borgohain (Ahom language: Chao Thao Lung) was the second of the two original counselors in the Ahom kingdom. He was selected by the Ahom king from members of the Ahom nobility (Satgharia Ahom), who vowed not to fight for the position of Ahom kingship, rather act as a guide to the Ahom king in matters of administering his province in an efficient manner (King Maker).The other original counsellor is the Burhagohain. Both the positions existed from the time of the first Ahom king, Sukaphaa. After the first major expansion of the Ahom kingdom, the Sadiya province was initially given to the Borgohain to administer. But later in the year 1527, he was replaced by King-lun Buragohain who was made Thao-mung Bo-ngen (Sadiyakhowa Gohain). After that, he was given the region south of the Dikhou river to Kaliabor on the south bank. In later times, he administered the region east of Burai on the north bank, as Borbarua was given the charge of territories between Sadiya province to Kaliabor.

List of Borgohains

 Thao Mong Kang Ngan
 Ta-Phi-Khun Borgohain
 Ta-Ph-Kun Borgohain
 Tya-Tan-Bin Borgohain
 Phra-Sheng-Mong Borgohain
 Kali-Kham Borgohain
 Ton-Kham Borgohain
 Kham-Shen Borgohain
 Khampet Borgohain
 Guimela Borgohain
 Piling Borgohain
 Leshai Borgohain
 Banrukia Langisong Borgohain
 Sengmung Borgohain
 Laluk Borgohain
 Jabang Borgohain
 Madurial Laithapana Borgohain
 Kamalakanta Borgohain
 Harinath Borgohain
 Thanunath Borgohain
 Dihingia Khamchang Borgohain
 Khamcheng Borgohain
 Numali Brogohain
 Madurial Barjana Borgohain
 Bailung Borgohain
 Madurial Bishnunarayan Borgohain
 Madurial Nirbhoynarayan Borgohain
 Gangaram Borgohain
 Narahari Borgohain

References

Bibliography

Ahom kingdom
Assamese-language surnames